Carmet is a census-designated place (CDP) in Sonoma County, California. The 2010 United States census reported Carmet's population was 47.

Geography
According to the United States Census Bureau, the CDP covers an area of 0.3 square miles (0.7 km2), all of it land.

Demographics

The 2010 United States Census reported that Carmet had a population of 47. The racial makeup of the CDP was 91.5% White, 2.1% Asian, and 6.4% from two or more races. 0.0% of the population was Hispanic or Latino of any race.

The Census reported that 100% of the population lived in households.

There were 29 households, out of which 1 (3.4%) had children under the age of 18 living in them, 11 (37.9%) were opposite-sex married couples living together, 0 (0%) had a female householder with no husband present, 1 (3.4%) had a male householder with no wife present.  There were 3 (10.3%) unmarried opposite-sex partnerships, and 0 (0%) same-sex married couples or partnerships. 15 households (51.7%) were made up of individuals, and 4 (13.8%) had someone living alone who was 65 years of age or older. The average household size was 1.62.  There were 12 families (41.4% of all households); the average family size was 2.25.

The population was spread out, with 2 people (4.3%) under the age of 18, 0 people (0%) aged 18 to 24, 6 people (12.8%) aged 25 to 44, 24 people (51.1%) aged 45 to 64, and 15 people (31.9%) who were 65 years of age or older.  The median age was 59.3 years. For every 100 females, there were 95.8 males.  For every 100 females age 18 and over, there were 87.5 males.

The homeowner vacancy rate was 7.7%; the rental vacancy rate was 16.7%. 85.1% of the population lived in owner-occupied housing units and 14.9% lived in rental housing units.

References

External links

Census-designated places in Sonoma County, California
Census-designated places in California
Populated coastal places in California